Henry Hall Alder (6 April 1874 – 17 May 1949) was an Australian rules footballer who played one game with Fitzroy in the Victorian Football League (VFL) in 1902.

References

External links

Australian rules footballers from Melbourne
Fitzroy Football Club players
1874 births
1949 deaths
People from Brunswick, Victoria